The 1926 Tour de France was the 20th edition of the Tour de France, one of cycling's Grand Tours. The Tour began in Evian on 20 June, and Stage 10 occurred on 6 July with a mountainous stage from Bayonne. The race finished in Paris on 18 July.

Stage 10
6 July 1926 - Bayonne to Luchon,

Stage 11
8 July 1926 - Luchon to Perpignan,

Stage 12
10 July 1926 - Perpignan to Toulon,

Stage 13
12 July 1926 - Toulon to Nice,

Stage 14
14 July 1926 - Nice to Briançon,

Stage 15
16 July 1926 - Briançon to Evian,

Stage 16
17 July 1926 - Evian to Dijon,

Stage 17
18 July 1926 - Dijon to Paris,

References

1926 Tour de France
Tour de France stages